Mary John Thottam (24 June 1901 – 20 May 1985), also identified as Sister Mary Benigna, was an Indian Catholic nun and a poet who wrote in Malayalam. She authored two mahakavyas, Marthoma Vijayam and Gandhi Jayanthi, a poetry anthology, Lokame Yathra, and other works. Pope Paul VI honoured her with the Benemerenti medal in 1971.

Biography 

Sister Mary Benigna, née Mary John Thottam, was born on 24 June 1901 at Elanji, a small village near Koothattukulam, in Ernakulam district in the south Indian state of Kerala to John Thottam and Pattasseril Mariam. Her early education was in the traditional way with a local teacher and later she did her formal education at Mutholi Convent School from where she passed the vernacular school leaving certificate (7th standard) to start her career as a teacher at St. Thomas Primary School, North Paravur. She took a break from service after 2 years pursue higher studies in Malayalam and after passing Malayalam higher examination, she returned to Paravur to teach at the English Middle School there. She moved to the Convent Middle School in Kuravilangad in 1922 as a teacher where she became the headmistress the next year.

Thottam's first work, a poetry anthology titled Geethavali, was released in 1927 which had the foreword written by Ulloor S. Parameswara Iyer, the noted poet. This was followed by several works which include two epics viz. Marthoma Vijayam and Gandhi Jayanthi, 10 khandakavyams and over 350 poems compiled in a number of anthologies. Besides, she also published four books of prose and a translation. She was one of the pioneers of women writers in Malayalam language and her book, Kavitharamam (A Garden of Poems), published in 1929 sold over 100,000 copies, making it a best seller of the times. Lokame Yatra (Farewell to the World), one of the poems in the anthology, was an autobiographical poem related to her becoming a nun. Pope Paul VI honoured her with the Benemerenti medal in 1971 and she was also honoured by the Catholic Laity Association in 1981.

Thottam entered the Catholic religious order of the Carmelites under the name of Mary Benigna on 16 July 1928 and superannuated from official service in 1961. She died on 20 May 1985, at the age of 83. Dravidian University has established a study centre in honour of Mary John Thottam. Her autobiography, Vanambadi (Nightingale) was published in 1986, a year after her death, along with an anthology of selected poems, under the title, Lokame Yatra.

Selected bibliography

See also 

 List of Malayalam-language authors by category
 List of Malayalam-language authors
 List of Benemerenti medal recipients

References

Further reading

External links 
 
 
 
 
 

Writers from Kerala
Malayalam-language writers
1901 births
1985 deaths
Malayali people
20th-century Indian poets
Recipients of the Benemerenti medal
People from Ernakulam district
20th-century Indian Roman Catholic nuns